Mowbray is an English surname. Notable people with the surname include:

 Alan Mowbray (1896–1969), English stage and film actor
 Anna Mowbray (born 1983/1984), New Zealand entrepreneur and businessperson
 Charles Mowbray (1857–1910), British anarcho-communist
 Ethel Jones Mowbray (died 1948), American teacher, co-founder of Alpha Kappa Alpha sorority
 Francis Mowbray (died 1603), Scottish intriguer
 Guy Mowbray (born 1972), British football commentator
 Harris Mowbray (born 1999), Braille-related linguist
 Harry Mowbray (born 1947), Scottish footballer
 Harry Siddons Mowbray (1858–1928), American artist
 Louis L. Mowbray (1877-1952), Bermudian naturalist 
 Malcolm Mowbray (born 1949), British screenwriter and director
 Nick Mowbray (born 1984/1985), New Zealand entrepreneur and businessperson
 Thomas Mowbray (Queensland clergyman) (fl. 1850s)
 Tony Mowbray (born 1963), English footballer

See also
 Mowbray (disambiguation)
 House of Mowbray
 Baron Mowbray
 Mowbray baronets